Dream 2047 is a monthly popular science magazine published by Vigyan Prasar, an autonomous institution under Department of Science and Technology, Government of India. The magazine has over fifty thousand subscribers. It is sent free to schools, colleges and individuals interested in science and technology communication.
 Bilingual science magazine published in Hindi and English
 Vigyan Prasar has published Dream 2047 for last 18 years
 The magazine is primarily used as resource materials for science communicators and teachers.

References

External links
 

1998 establishments in Delhi
English-language magazines published in India
Monthly magazines published in India
Science and technology magazines published in India
Magazines established in 1998
Ministry of Science and Technology (India)
Popular science magazines
Magazines published in Delhi